Family.Show is a free and open-source genealogy program written in C# and running on the .NET Framework. Microsoft partnered with and commissioned Vertigo Software in 2006 to create it as a reference application for Microsoft's latest UI technology and software deployment mechanism at the time, Windows Presentation Foundation and ClickOnce. The source code has originally been published on Microsoft's CodePlex website. It has since been forked and development continues independent of Microsoft on GitHub.

Overview
Family.Show includes the following features:

 Data grid to edit person information.
 Add photos easily via drag-and-drop and write rich text stories about family members.
 A family tree diagram which supports panning, zooming and a time slider control to display the tree from a historical perspective.
 Multiple sequential and concurrent spousal relationships.
 Family statistics such as last name tag cloud, age distribution histogram and birthday list.
 Partial support for GEDCOM 5.5, a de facto genealogy format.
 Change the look of the entire application by choosing a different skin.

Family.Show is intended as a reference sample and not a feature complete genealogy application. Some limitations are:

 Support of a single birth and death event per person.
 No support for approximate dates (Abt. 1815, Bet. Jan 1707/08 - Jan 1708/09, Bef. 1931).

The software is licensed under the Microsoft Public License.

File format
Family.Show uses an Open Package Convention file format (*.familyx) to save family data, stories, and photos in one file.

See also

ActiveDirectory.Show - Derived from Family.Show - MSDN Code Gallery
 Free software movement

References

External links
Vertigo Software Family.Show Page
Family.Show Page at Codeplex

Free genealogy software
Microsoft free software
Software using the MS-PL license
Windows-only free software
Windows-only genealogy software
2007 software